Winter Story or A Winter Story may refer to:

Books
Winter Story (Brambly Hedge) 1980 children's picture book in Jill Barklem's Brambly Hedge series
Secret of the Wings (redirect from Tinker Bell: A Winter Story) 
Eit vintereventyr (A Winter Story), debut novel of Norwegian writer Jan Roar Leikvoll 2008

Film and TV

Winter Story, animated film in The Enchanted World of Brambly Hedge VHS 1998
A Winter Story, 2001 animated Flash film by Ola Schubert
A Winter Story, 1986, TV Mike Young (producer), Calon (TV production company)
Winter Story (:ja:冬物語 (テレビドラマ) fuyu monogatari), 1972 Japanese TV drama
Winter Story (:ko:겨울 이야기 (드라마) gyeoul iyagi), 1991 MBC Korean TV drama

Music

Albums
 Winter Story (Shinhwa album), a 2003 K-pop album
Winter Story, a 2007 album by Mandy Chiang
Winter Story, album by Singaporean pianist Eric Chiryoku 2005 
Winter Story, ( ספור של חורף ) album by Miki Gavrielov of The Churchills  2000

Songs
"A Winter Story", single by Aled Jones 1986
"Winter Story", single by Takako Okamura from Brand-New
"Winter Story", single by Korean hip hop band DJ Doc
"Winter Story", single by Saeko Chiba written by Yuki Kajiura 2003
"Winter Story", single by Mio Isayama 2004 
"Winter Story", single by Korean singer Harisu
"Winter Story", song by Steven Grossman (musician) from Something in the Moonlight, posthumous 2011

See also
The Johnny Winter Story, Johnny Winter 1969